"Truth" is the fifth episode of the American television miniseries The Falcon and the Winter Soldier, based on Marvel Comics featuring the characters Sam Wilson / Falcon and Bucky Barnes / Winter Soldier. It follows the pair as they return home after fighting with the Flag Smashers, while John Walker faces consequences for his actions. The episode is set in the Marvel Cinematic Universe (MCU), sharing continuity with the films of the franchise. It was written by Dalan Musson and directed by Kari Skogland.

Sebastian Stan and Anthony Mackie reprise their respective roles as Bucky Barnes and Sam Wilson from the film series, with Emily VanCamp, Wyatt Russell (Walker), Erin Kellyman, Julia Louis-Dreyfus, Florence Kasumba, Danny Ramirez, Georges St-Pierre, Adepero Oduye, and Daniel Brühl also starring. Development began by October 2018, and Skogland joined in May 2019. Louis-Dreyfus is introduced as Valentina Allegra de Fontaine in a surprise cameo appearance that had previously been teased for the episode and was kept a secret on set. Filming took place at Pinewood Atlanta Studios in Atlanta, Georgia, with location filming in the Atlanta metropolitan area and in Prague.

"Truth" was released on the streaming service Disney+ on April 16, 2021. Critics praised the focus on characters and themes, while Louis-Dreyfus' appearance also received positive responses. The episode received a Primetime Emmy Award nomination.

Plot 
After using Captain America's shield to kill one of the Flag Smashers in public, John Walker flees, but is pursued by Sam Wilson and Bucky Barnes. Wilson demands that Walker hand over the shield, but he refuses. In the ensuing fight, Walker destroys Wilson's wingsuit, but Wilson and Barnes take the shield from him, breaking his arm in the process. Wilson then leaves his damaged wingsuit with Joaquin Torres and asks him to continue looking for the Flag Smashers.

Barnes finds Helmut Zemo at a memorial in Sokovia and hands him over to the Dora Milaje. While Ayo advises him not to return to Wakanda for some time, he asks her to forward a favor to the country. Meanwhile, Walker receives an other than honorable discharge and is stripped of his role as Captain America. Afterward, he is approached by Contessa Valentina Allegra de Fontaine, who tells him that taking the serum and killing the Flag Smasher was the right thing to do and says she will contact him in the future. Walker later visits his late partner Lemar Hoskins' family, and claims that the man he killed is the one who killed Hoskins.

Wilson returns to Baltimore to visit Isaiah Bradley, who discusses his past as a Black super soldier and how he was imprisoned after rescuing fellow soldiers who had also been experimented on before stating that a Black man would never be allowed to become Captain America nor should one want to. Wilson then returns home to Louisiana and helps his sister Sarah fix the family boat, with assistance from several locals as well as Barnes, who delivers a briefcase from the Wakandans to Wilson. Wilson and Barnes train with the shield and agree to move on from their pasts and work together.

Meanwhile, the Flag Smashers plan an attack on a Global Repatriation Council (GRC) conference in New York City. They are joined by Georges Batroc, who wants to kill Wilson and was released from prison by Sharon Carter. When Torres contacts Wilson and tells him the Flag Smashers have been detected in New York City, Wilson decides to intervene and opens the briefcase.

In a mid-credits scene, Walker builds a new shield from scrap metal and his Medal of Honor.

Production

Development 
By October 2018, Marvel Studios was developing a limited series starring Anthony Mackie's Sam Wilson / Falcon and Sebastian Stan's Bucky Barnes / Winter Soldier from the Marvel Cinematic Universe (MCU) films. Malcolm Spellman was hired as head writer of the series, which was announced as The Falcon and the Winter Soldier in April 2019. Spellman modeled the series after buddy films that deal with race, such as 48 Hrs. (1982), The Defiant Ones (1958), Lethal Weapon (1987), and Rush Hour (1998). Kari Skogland was hired to direct the miniseries a month later, and executive produced alongside Spellman and Marvel Studios' Kevin Feige, Louis D'Esposito, Victoria Alonso, and Nate Moore. The fifth episode, titled "Truth", was written by Dalan Musson. It takes its name from the comic book Truth: Red, White & Black by Robert Morales and Kyle Baker, which tells the story of the character Isaiah Bradley, a Black man who became Captain America after being imprisoned and experimented on. The episode was released on the streaming service Disney+ on April 16, 2021.

Writing 
Spellman felt episode five was the one in the series where "it just gets real", while Moore added the episode would tie many of the various plot threads together that "maybe felt disparate or not fully formed together" and "really gets to be the culmination of the theme" of legacy for the series. Co-executive producer Zoie Nagelhout felt Valentina Allegra de Fontaine was "the perfect character" to enter John Walker's life as a way to "complicate what he's going through and give him a weird almost ominous light at the end of the tunnel". She continued that since Walker is someone who needs to have a purpose in their life, meeting de Fontaine excites him and created a "catharsis" for him. Spellman decided to add de Fontaine to the series after looking for a member of the CIA or S.H.I.E.L.D. in the comic books who could be the one to "embrace [Walker] after all he's been through" and set him on his new journey.

Mackie said the moment when Barnes said he never considered the implications of a Black man becoming Captain America was "the huge turning point" for Wilson, adding it was "a cathartic experience" and one that turned Wilson "completely on his head and moved him in the direction of accepting the idea of being Captain America".

Casting 
The episode stars Sebastian Stan as Bucky Barnes, Anthony Mackie as Sam Wilson, Emily VanCamp as Sharon Carter, Wyatt Russell as John Walker, Erin Kellyman as Karli Morgenthau, Julia Louis-Dreyfus as de Fontaine, Florence Kasumba as Ayo, Danny Ramirez as Joaquin Torres, Georges St-Pierre as Georges Batroc, Adepero Oduye as Sarah Wilson, and Daniel Brühl as Helmut Zemo. Also appearing are Clé Bennett as Lemar Hoskins / Battlestar, Carl Lumbly as Isaiah Bradley, Desmond Chiam as Dovich, Dani Deetee as Gigi, Indya Bussey as DeeDee, Renes Rivera as Lennox, Tyler Dean Flores as Diego, Chase River McGhee as Cass, Aaron Haynes as AJ, Gabrielle Byndloss as Olivia Walker, Janeshia Adams-Ginyard as Nomble, Zola Williams as Yama, Elijah Richardson as Eli Bradley, Jane Rumbaua as Ayla, Salem Murphy as Lacont, and Noah Mills as Nico.

Ahead of the episode's release, Spellman teased that it would feature a big cameo appearance and said this would be a grounded character with a strong personality. He added that it would not be an Avenger, while Moore specifically said the cameo would not be Chadwick Boseman's T'Challa / Black Panther, in response to speculation from fans. Hoai-Tran Bui at /Film reported that the cameo would not be an existing MCU character and would instead be the introduction of an established comic book character to the MCU, portrayed by a well-known actor. The episode reveals this cameo to be Louis-Dreyfus as de Fontaine. Commentators likened the character's appearance to an "anti-Nick Fury", with speculation that she could be the Power Broker or another building block leading to the introduction of the Thunderbolts team in the MCU. Joanna Robinson of Vanity Fair reported that Louis-Dreyfus had been expected to first appear as de Fontaine in Black Widow (2021) before COVID-19 pandemic delays pushed that film's premiere until after The Falcon and the Winter Soldier was released. Robinson said it was unclear if Louis-Dreyfus was still expected to appear in the film, but she ultimately does appear in the film's post-credits scene, with Feige noting that this was originally intended to be the character's introduction but ended up being a reference to her appearance in The Falcon and the Winter Soldier. Spellman was unaware of the character's planned appearance in Black Widow when he decided to add her to the series.

Filming and visual effects 
Filming took place at Pinewood Atlanta Studios in Atlanta, Georgia, with Skogland directing, and P.J. Dillon serving as cinematographer. Location filming took place in the Atlanta metropolitan area and in Prague. Moore believed "Truth" was the series' strongest episode from an acting and filmmaking standpoint. The action scene with Wilson, Barnes, and Walker took place in a warehouse location the production team had found a few days earlier. The stunt team had not prepared for the scene prior and had improvised and defined the fight choreography during filming. Louis-Dreyfus was on set for a couple days to film her role, and she was described as a "walking code-red-level Marvel secret" due to the secrecy surrounding her appearance. Russell said the actress was spontaneous with her performance, and described the character of de Fontaine as "endlessly interesting because [Louis-Dreyfus is] endlessly interesting". Moore added that Louis-Dreyfus has a natural likability to her, that when she showed "those darker tendencies to her character, it's a little bit more surprising and entertaining" because it was unexpected. Visual effects for the episode were created by Tippett Studio, Trixter, Digital Frontier FX, QPPE, Stereo D, Cantina Creative, Crafty Apes, and Rodeo FX.

Music 
Selections from composer Henry Jackman's score for the episode were included in the series' Vol. 2 soundtrack album, which was released digitally by Marvel Music and Hollywood Records on April 30, 2021.

Marketing 
On March 19, 2021, Marvel announced a series of posters that were created by various artists to correspond with the episodes of the series. The posters were released weekly ahead of each episode, with the fifth poster, designed by graphic designer Doaly, being revealed on April 14. After the episode's release, Marvel announced merchandise inspired by the episode as part of its weekly "Marvel Must Haves" promotion for each episode of the series, including apparel, accessories, and a Marvel Legends Captain America shield.

Reception

Audience viewership 
Nielsen Media Research, who measure the number of minutes watched by United States audiences on television sets, listed The Falcon and the Winter Soldier as the most-watched original series across streaming services for the week of April 12 to 18, 2021. Between the first five episodes, which were available at the time, the series had 855 million minutes viewed, which was the highest total the series had achieved thus far.

Critical response 
The review aggregator website Rotten Tomatoes reported a 100% approval rating with an average score of 8.4/10 based on 29 reviews. The site's critical consensus reads, "With epic fight scenes and emotional moments galore, 'Truth' fully lives up to the show's potential—while finally letting Sam grow into his."

Rolling Stones Alan Sepinwall felt "Truth" was easily the best episode of the series so far, feeling it was introspection-heavy but did not drag like previous episodes with that focus. He felt the opening fight between Wilson, Barnes, and Walker was inevitable and hit harder than the series' previous action sequences due to its emotion stakes, and he also felt Wilson's return to Louisiana was more "lived-in and entertaining" than similar scenes in the series' premiere, but he described Walker's visit to Hoskins' family as one of the series' "clunkiest" moments. Sepinwall noted that the Louisiana scenes would likely have been cut if this was a feature film rather than a series, and concluded that by setting up Wilson as a version of Captain America in contrast to Walker, the series was exploring "more complicated territory than the MCU has generally entered in the past... [and] by taking a step back from the story for a week, 'Truth' was able to dig in and really wrestle with all the implications of the choice Sam is making". Sulagna Misra at The A.V. Club gave the episode an "A" saying that even though Wilson's story was on a smaller scale than that of Barnes', because it was smaller and more relatable made the pair's "frank discussion" about what it means to be a Black person with the shield "feel so earned".

Writing for Entertainment Weekly, Chancellor Agard agreed with Sepinwall that this was the best episode of the series so far, with Wilson and Barnes "taking some long-awaited and necessary steps forward". Agard likened the opening fight of the episode to the final fight between Steve Rogers, Barnes, and Tony Stark in Captain America: Civil War but felt the series was not intentionally trying to mimic that fight, especially since it was "not nearly as impactful because we only really care about two of the characters" in the episode fight. His favorite moments of the episode were Wilson's conversation with Bradley, and the scenes set in Louisiana, giving "Truth" a "B+". Matt Purslow of IGN gave the episode a 7 out of 10, believing the focus on character weighed the episode down. Though "Truth" "features some of the show's most impactful moments so far, and further molds its characters in admirable ways", Purslow felt overall the episode "meanders, delays looming threats, and delivers underwhelming conclusions". One of the high points for Purslow was Wilson's conversation with Bradley, which was "a landmark moment" for the MCU, with the scene performed with "profound gravity" by the actors.

Louis-Dreyfus' cameo was also discussed. Sepinwall called it "both startling and delightful" to see her appear, with a performance that was "caustic, smooth, and funny". Robinson believed the character had "a lot of potential" for the MCU and felt Louis-Dreyfus was "an ideal choice" to be one of the MCU's next over arching villains. Agard agreed with Robinson, believing casting Louis-Dreyfus in the role meant the MCU had "big plans for her". However, Purslow did not think the cameo made any impact since there was no background for who de Fontaine was or any threat she may pose. Following the episode's release, sales of Strange Tales #159, which was de Fontaine's first comic book appearance (in the "Nick Fury, Agent of S.H.I.E.L.D." feature), increased in value on eBay, particularly those with high grades from Certified Guaranty Company denoting good condition.

Accolades 
For the 73rd Primetime Creative Arts Emmy Awards, John Nania, Aaron Toney, and Justin Eaton were nominated for Outstanding Stunt Performance for their work on the episode.

References

External links 
 
 Episode recap at Marvel.com

2021 American television episodes
The Falcon and the Winter Soldier episodes
Television episodes about racism
Television episodes set in Asia
Television episodes set in Baltimore
Television episodes set in Louisiana
Television episodes set in New York City
Television episodes set in Riga
Television episodes set in the 2020s
Television episodes set in Washington, D.C.
Television episodes set on fictional islands
Television episodes written by Dalan Musson
Works set in fictional countries